The  (literally 'alder marsh', meaning 'marsh populated with alder trees') is a  municipal forest in Hanover, Germany. It is the largest urban city forest in Germany, one of the largest in Europe, and is nearly twice the size of Central Park in New York. The biggest German urban park in the strict sense of the word, however, is the  English Garden in Munich.

Size comparison 
In Germany, the Eilenriede is part of a group of inner-city and near-city forest areas, like the Rostock Heath, the Dresden Heath, the Frankfurter Stadtwald and the Berliner Grunewald. The Eilenriede is around the same size as the Stadtwald in Duisburg and is nearly twice as large as Central Park in New York.

Location 

Activities 
The city forest offers a range of different possibilities in leisure activities, like:

 Hanover Zoo
 Strolls and walks
 Horseback riding
 Bicycle riding
 Hiking
 Running
 Wood trails
 Children playground
 Woodstation
 Dendrology path
 Lawn for sunbathing
 Catering (restaurants, kiosks and forest cafes)
 Monuments and memorials
 Minigolf
 Bob run
 Path for the blind 
 Skating area starting Lister Turm up to Steuerndieb
 High rope course

See also
 List of urban parks by size

General references 
 Kemper, Edwin/ Nowak, Helmut (Hrsg.): Eilenriede-Festschrift. Beihefte zu den Berichten der Naturhistorischen Gesellschaft zu Hannover, Heft 7, Hannover 1971.
 Hans Brauns u.a.: Die Eilenriede. Sonderheft der Hannoversche Geschichtsblätter, herausgegeben vom Stadtarchiv der Landeshauptstadt Hannover, Hannover, Eigenverlag, 1938.
 H.-W. Heine: Die mittelalterliche Landwehr von Hannover in: Führer zu vor- und frühgeschichtlichen Denkmälern 49 (1981), S. 48–55
 August Jugler: Die Eilenriede in alter Zeit. Ein Kulturbild aus Hannovers Vergangenheit. Hannover, Klindworths 1884.
 Speier, Martin; Pott, Richard: Der hannoversche Stadtwald "Eilenriede" in geobotanischer und historischer Sicht. In: Hundert Jahre Reinhold Tüxen. Geobotanik und Vegetationsgeographie. Hrsg.: Richard Pott. Hannover 1999, S. 279–303.
 Bettina Borgemeister: Die Stadt und ihr Wald. Eine Untersuchung zur Waldgeschichte der Städte Göttingen und Hannover vom 13. bis zum 18. Jahrhundert. Hannover, Hahn 2005. (Veröffentlichungen der Historischen Kommission für Niedersachsen und Bremen. 228) .
 Joachim Lehrmann: Räuberbanden zwischen Harz und Weser. Lehrte, Lehrmann-Verlag 2004. . (darin ausführlich Hannovers Raubmörder Hanebuth)
 Stadtwälder in Hannover - Die Eilenriede. Broschüre als aktualisierte Neuauflage von 2004, Hannover.
 Eilenriedekarte, Maßstab 1:10.000. 3. Auflage, Hannover. (Broschüre und Karte kostenlos bei: Fachbereich Umwelt und Stadtgrün der Landeshauptstadt Hannover)
 Janet Anschütz (Autorin), ADAC Niedersachsen Sachsen-Anhalt (Herausgeber): Motorrad Rennsport: Internationale Eilenriede-Rennen zu Hannover 1924-1955. MatrixMedia-Verlag 2009. 
  (zu Eilenriede-Motorradrennen)
 Helmut Knocke, Hugo Thielen: Eilenriede, in: ''Hannover Kunst- und Kultur-Lexikon, S. 101ff.

External links 

 Informationen über die Eilenriede bei www.hannover.de
  Description in german and images concerning the Eilenriede
 Hermann Löns über die Eilenriede 1907 im Aufsatz von Aadje Ziesenis
 Maßnahmenprogramm zu Entwicklung von Landschaftsräumen; Landeshauptstadt Hannover; (PDF, 3,26 MB)
 Holzgang und Diebstahl in Hannovers Stadtwald Eilenriede

Parks in Germany
Forests and woodlands of Lower Saxony